Malte Möller (24 February 1914 – 13 October 1997) was a Swedish wrestler. He competed in the men's Greco-Roman flyweight at the 1948 Summer Olympics.

References

External links
 

1914 births
1997 deaths
Swedish male sport wrestlers
Olympic wrestlers of Sweden
Wrestlers at the 1948 Summer Olympics
People from Östra Göinge Municipality
Sportspeople from Skåne County
20th-century Swedish people